WNIK-FM (106.5 FM)  branded on-air as Super K 106, is a radio station broadcasting a Top 40/CHR format. Licensed to Arecibo, Puerto Rico, it serves the northern Puerto Rico area.  The station is currently owned by Kelly Broadcasting System Corporation.

External links

NIK-FM
Radio stations established in 1965
1965 establishments in Puerto Rico
NIK-FM